Tamanuku, formerly known as FC Teasi, is a Tuvaluan football club from Nukufetau that currently plays in the Tuvalu A-Division.

The team's home ground is the Tuvalu Sports Ground, the only stadium in Tuvalu. Tamanuku plays on an amateur level, as do all the teams in Tuvalu. They also have a reserve squad and a women's team.

History
Tamanuku was formed in 1980. The first name was FC Teasi. Tamanuku won the Independence Cup in 2005, against Lakena United with a score of 1–0. They also won the NBT Cup in 2013, against Tofaga A with a score of 4-2.

Current squad
As of 5 July 2012.

Tamanuku B

Honours

Cup
Independence Cup
Winners (1): 2005
Runners-up (2): 2006, 2011
NBT Cup
Winners (1): 2013
Runners-up (2): 2006, 2011
Tuvalu Games
Runners-up (2):2012

See also
 Tamanuku Women

References

External links
Dutch Support Tuvalu
Tuvalu National Football Association

Football clubs in Tuvalu
Nukufetau
1980s establishments in Tuvalu
Association football clubs established in 1980